Clube Esportivo Dom Bosco, commonly known as Dom Bosco, are a Brazilian football team from Cuiabá. They won the Campeonato Matogrossense six times and competed in the Série A three times. Dom Bosco are the oldest club from Mato Grosso state.

History
They were founded on January 4, 1925, being the oldest club from Mato Grosso state. Dom Bosco won the Campeonato Matogrossense for the first time in 1958. The club competed in the Série A in 1977, 1978 and in 1979. They finished in the last place in 1977.

Stadium
They play their home games at the Verdão stadium. The stadium has a maximum capacity of 47,000 people.

Achievements

 Campeonato Matogrossense:
 Winners (6): 1958, 1960, 1963, 1966, 1971, 1991

References

Association football clubs established in 1925
Football clubs in Mato Grosso
1925 establishments in Brazil